Wilfrid Bernard Belcher MC, (25 July 1891 – 28 January 1963) was an Anglican bishop in the mid 20th century.

Early life 
Belcher was educated at King's School, Bruton and Keble College, Oxford, the son of William Henry Belcher, a Newbury solicitor and his wife, Mary.

Religious life 
Belcher was ordained in 1922. His early career was spent with the Bush Brotherhood in Australia. He held incumbencies at Rickmansworth, Cheshunt and Durban before being appointed Bishop of North Queensland in 1947, a post he held for five years. He was consecrated a bishop on 15 February 1948. After this he was Rector of Diss and Assistant Bishop of Norwich, then Vicar of York cum Ravensworth in Natal. His last post was that of Rector of Ovington, Hampshire.

Later life 
He died on 28 January 1963.

References 

1891 births
People educated at King's School, Bruton
Alumni of Keble College, Oxford
Recipients of the Military Cross
Anglican bishops of North Queensland
1963 deaths
Alumni of Bishops' College, Cheshunt
Bush Brotherhood priests